Nadejda Popov (born March 10, 1994) is a Canadian rugby sevens player. She won a gold medal at the 2015 Pan American Games as a member of the Canada women's national rugby sevens team.

References

1994 births
Living people
Canada international rugby sevens players
Female rugby sevens players
Rugby sevens players at the 2015 Pan American Games
Pan American Games gold medalists for Canada
Pan American Games medalists in rugby sevens
Medalists at the 2015 Pan American Games
Canada international women's rugby sevens players